The Boys Are Back is the thirtieth studio album of country music group The Oak Ridge Boys. It was released in 2009 under the Spring Hill Music Group label. The album marked the group's return to secular country music after releasing gospel albums since 1992. The track "Seven Nation Army," a cover of The White Stripes's 2003 song from their album Elephant, was released as the album's first single.

The track "Beautiful Bluebird" was written and previously recorded by country rock musical artist Neil Young for his 1985 album Old Ways, but was not included and instead featured on his 2007 album Chrome Dreams II. The track "Boom Boom" was written and recorded by John Lee Hooker on his 1962 album Burnin' . The song is listed in the Rock and Roll Hall of Fame's 500 Songs that Shaped Rock and Roll.

Background
After signing with Spring Hill Music Group in 2001, the group returned to its roots from the 1940s, releasing gospel material. But just as the group focused on country-pop in the late 1970s, the Oak Ridge Boys "recreated" themselves before the album's release, according to band member and producer Duane Allen.

Shooter Jennings, the son of the late country music legend Waylon Jennings, asked the Oak Ridge Boys to collaborate with him on his 2007 album The Wolf. Jennings introduced the group to record producer Dave Cobb, and invited them to a performance. After being surprised by the reaction of the youth-dominated crowd to the tune of "Elvira", Cobb took the band to a studio where they experimented with different sounds.

The group recorded the album in a studio in Nashville formerly used by Waylon Jennings, next door to the Oak Ridge Boys' former office. According to Allen, the album took only two weeks to record, with the group spending time in the studio every day until midnight or thereafter.

When asked about the album's content, bass singer Richard Sterban commented, "If there's something I could compare this to, it would be what Johnny Cash did in the later part of his career."

Reception
The record reached #16 on country album charts, the band's highest ranking since their 1988 album Monongahela. The album also stood at #77 on the Billboard 200, the group's first top 100 activity and highest ranking on the chart since the 1983 album American Made.
American Dreams
Allmusic gave the album a mixed review. While giving the album three out of five stars, the critic described the group as "overcompensating greatly." The title track, is described as "repetitive." The song "Seven Army Nation," received the most negative criticism, cited for missing "the mark by a mile" and showing "little understanding" of the song. "Boom Boom" also received negative marks from allmusic, who thought that Richard Sterban sounded like a "randy Mr. Ed." The reviewer also said that the album is a "fitfully entertaining comeback."

The Times Record News gave the album a B, lauding the vocals on the title track as "rich" and "unique." The publication cited the tracks "Mama’s Table," "Troublin’ Mind," "Live With Jesus" and "Hold Me Closely" as the standouts of the record.

Track listing

Chart

Singles

References

2009 albums
The Oak Ridge Boys albums
Albums produced by Dave Cobb